My Dead Dad's Porno Tapes is a 2018 Canadian short documentary film, directed by Charlie Tyrell.

Summary
Blending stop-motion animation, family interviews via phone and live footage, the film depicts Tyrell's attempt to make sense of his complicated relationship with his late father Greg through his remaining possessions, including but not limited to his collection of 1980s porn videotapes.

Accolades
The film was named to the Toronto International Film Festival's year-end Canada's Top Ten list for 2018, and won the Canadian Screen Award for Best Short Documentary at the 7th Canadian Screen Awards in 2019. It was also shortlisted for the Academy Award for Best Documentary Short Film.

References

External links
My Dead Dad's Porno Tapes at The Atlantic
 
MUBI

2018 films
2018 short documentary films
Canadian short documentary films
Best Short Documentary Film Genie and Canadian Screen Award winners
Documentary films about pornography
Collage film
Films about dysfunctional families
2010s English-language films
2010s Canadian films